Khalaj-e Ajam (also Romanized as Khalaj-e ‘Ajam; also known as Khalaj Kord-e ‘Ajam) is a village in Yowla Galdi Rural District, in the Central District of Showt County, West Azerbaijan Province, Iran. At the 2006 census, its population was 360, in 92 families.

References 

Populated places in Showt County